The Ewaso Nyiro labeo (Labeo percivali) is an African species of freshwater fish in the family Cyprinidae. 

Its natural habitat is rivers, and it is found only in Kenya, where its namesame river flows.

It is classified as a threatened species by the IUCN.

References

Labeo
Fish described in 1912
Taxonomy articles created by Polbot